A.K. Selvaraj (born 4 July 1958) is an Indian politician. He served as a Member of Parliament, represented from Tamil Nadu state in the Rajya Sabha (the upper house of Indian Parliament).

Since taking charge as the Member of the Legislative Assembly for Tirupur South, he has been bringing various welfare schemes to the people. In particular, he has introduced a program called ‘Immediate Solution to Your Grievances’ to get rid of people’s problems immediately and go directly to where people are and listen to their grievances and correct them.

He was the Minister for Housing & Urban Development.

See also
 Rajya Sabha members from Tamil Nadu

References

1958 births
Living people
All India Anna Dravida Munnetra Kazhagam politicians
Rajya Sabha members from Tamil Nadu
People from Coimbatore district
Tamil Nadu MLAs 1991–1996
Tamil Nadu MLAs 2021–2026
Vokkaliga politicians